The Viscera Film Festival was an annual Los Angeles based horror film festival for women filmmakers. Originally an online festival, Viscera was founded in 2007 by Shannon Lark and Heidi Honeycutt. In July 2010, the festival became a live event with screenings held at the Egyptian Theatre in Hollywood. All of the screenings were short films.  After the Egyptian Theatre premiere, Viscera toured their yearly film lineup at events held around the world for the rest of the year.  The Scream Queen Filmfest Tokyo was a subsidiary festival.

Inspiration Award 
The Inspiration Award was founded in 2012 to honor women filmmakers.
 2012: Mary Lambert
 2013: Jennifer Lynch

References

Film festivals in Los Angeles
Fantasy and horror film festivals in the United States